This page is a timeline of social media. Major launches, milestones, and other major events are included.

Overview

Timeline

(*) Such launches are not initial launches, but rather relaunches.

See also
 Timeline of Facebook
 Timeline of Instagram
 Timeline of LinkedIn
 Timeline of Pinterest
 Timeline of Snapchat
 Timeline of Twitter

References

Social media
Social media